Stenanthemum newbeyi is a species of flowering plant in the family Rhamnaceae and is endemic to a restricted area in the south of Western Australia. It is an erect or spreading shrub with hairy young stems, egg-shaped leaves with the narrower end towards the base, and clusters of rust-coloured, densely shaggy-hairy flowers, surrounded by whitish floral leaves.

Description
The upper surface of the leaf is velvety-hairy and the lower surface is densely covered with shaggy, rust-coloured hairs.

Taxonomy and naming
Stenanthemum newbeyi was first formally described in 1995 by Barbara Lynette Rye in the journal Nuytsia from specimens collected on Bungalbin Hill in 1989. The specific epithet (newbeyi) honours Kenneth Newbey.

Distribution and habitat
This species grows on rocky hills and is only known from the type location and nearby hills in the Coolgardie bioregion of southern Western Australia.

Conservation status
Stenanthemum newbeyi is listed as "Priority Three" by the Government of Western Australia Department of Biodiversity, Conservation and Attractions, meaning that it is poorly known and known from only a few locations but is not under imminent threat.

References

newbeyi
Rosales of Australia
Flora of Western Australia
Plants described in 1995
Taxa named by Barbara Lynette Rye